Limekiln Falls is  located on South Branch Moose River southeast of Old Forge, New York.

References

Waterfalls of New York (state)
Landforms of Herkimer County, New York
Tourist attractions in Herkimer County, New York